This article is the discography of British rock and roll revival band Showaddywaddy.

Albums

Studio albums

Live albums

Compilation albums

Video albums

Singles

Notes

References 

Discographies of British artists
Rock music group discographies